Massiah is a surname, and may refer to:

Gustave Massiah, or Gus, (born 1941), French economist, urbanist, and political analyst
Louis Massiah, American filmmaker
Steve Massiah (born 1979), Guyana born American cricketer
 Winston Massiah, see Massiah v. United States (1964), case in the Supreme Court of the United States
Zeeteah Massiah, British singer from Barbados, West Indies
Frederica Massiah-Jackson, Philadelphia Court of Common Pleas judge
Massiah McDonald (born 1990), Montserratian footballer